Wellesley College may refer to: 

 Wellesley College, Wellesley, Massachusetts, U.S., a women's liberal arts college
Wellesley College Botanic Gardens
Wellesley College Tupelos
 Wellesley College, New Zealand, a boys' school in Days Bay, Eastbourne

See also
Wellesley, Massachusetts
Arthur Wellesley, 1st Duke of Wellington